Foston is a village and a civil parish in the South Kesteven district of Lincolnshire, England. The A1 road runs through the parish and borders the south of the village. The population of the civil parish at the 2011 census was 525.

History

According to A Dictionary of British Place Names, Foston derives from "a farmstead or a village of a man called Fotr"; Fotr being an Old Scandinavian person name. In the Domesday Book, Foston is written as 'Foztun'.

In Domesday there are entries for two manors in the Hundred of Loveden at Foston. Between the two there were 64 households, with 12 villagers, 6 smallholders, and 43 freemen. The manorial lord of one manor in 1066 was Thorfridh, this transferred by 1086 to Hervey; the other in 1066, Earl Ralph the constable, transferred to Count Alan of Brittany who was also Tenant-in-chief to King William I for both manors.

The ecclesiastical parish was a joint benefice with Long Bennington under the patronage of Queen Victoria. The impropriator was the Earl of Dysart, but the tithes (tax income from parishioners derived from their profit on sales, or extraction of produce and animals, typically to the tenth part) were commuted after an enclosure of 1793 [under the 1773 Inclosure Act]. A National School was built in 1847. The nearest railway station was at Hougham. Trades listed in 1872 included three tailors, four shopkeepers, two shoemakers, a cattle salesman, a corn miller, a butcher, a carpenter, a blacksmith, a machine owner, a harness maker who was also an assistant overseer, two carriers—horse-drawn wagon operators carrying goods and sometimes people between places of trade—operating between the village and both Newark and Grantham, and seven farmers, four of whom were also graziers. There were the licensed victuallers of The White Horse, The Duke William and The Black Boy public houses. The victualler of The Black Boy was also a wheelwright.

Landmarks
At the south of the parish, south from the A1 and east from Foston Road leading to Allington, is the site of an 18th-century windmill.

Foston contains five listed buildings. The Grade I parish Church of St Peter on Church Street dates to the late 12th century, with later additions and changes, including, in 1859, those by Charles Kirk, son to the senior Charles Kirk. Foston's Grade II listed buildings on Main Street are: the brick built Manor Farmhouse, dating to the late 18th century; the late 18th-century 'Renard', a red brick house converted from two cottages; and The Old Hall, a stone and red brick house dating at its earliest to 1647. On Newark Hill is The Old Post Office, a Grade II brick house dating to the early 19th century.

References

External links

 Foston Village Community Web site

Villages in Lincolnshire
Civil parishes in Lincolnshire
South Kesteven District